Pericles Lewis is the Douglas Tracy Smith Professor of comparative literature at Yale University and the Dean of Yale College.

Previously at Yale, he was the founding President of Yale-NUS College, a liberal arts college in Singapore that is jointly governed by  Yale and the National University of Singapore, as well as Vice President for Global Strategy and Vice Provost for Academic Initiatives.

Biography
Lewis was born in Canada on September 13, 1968.  He is the grandson of Canadian Member of Parliament Andrew Brewin. He attended high school at the University of Toronto Schools and received his bachelor's degree in English literature from McGill University in 1990. He received the degree of A.M. in comparative literature in 1991 and his Ph.D, also in comparative literature, in 1997 from  Stanford University, where his dissertation supervisor was Hans Ulrich Gumbrecht. He travelled extensively in Asia as a young man.

Academic career 
He was appointed Assistant Professor at Yale in the Departments of English and Comparative Literature in 1998, promoted to Associate Professor there in 2002, and full Professor in 2007. He was director of Undergraduate Studies for the Yale literature major from 2000 to 2006, and Director of Graduate Studies of Yale's Comparative Literature Department from 2006 to 2010.  He was the recipient of the McGill Graduates' Society Award for Student Service (1990), a Whiting Fellowship (1997), the Heyman Prize (2000), a Morse Fellowship (2001), and the Yale Graduate Mentor Award (2004).
As a scholar, he is best known for his books Modernism, Nationalism, and the Novel, The Cambridge Introduction to Modernism and Religious Experience and the Modernist Novel. He is also an editor of the third and fourth editions of the widely used Norton Anthology of World Literature (2012; 2018) 

He was the Project Director of the Yale Modernism Lab, a website for "collaborative research into the roots of literary modernism".

As Yale's Vice President for Global Strategy from 2017 to 2022, he was involved in planning the launches of the Yale Jackson School for Global Affairs, the Yale Institute for Global Health and the Yale Schwarzman Center.

He became the Dean of Yale College on July 1, 2022.

Yale-NUS
He was appointed President  of Yale-NUS, a liberal arts college affiliated with both Yale and the National University of Singapore, by a joint search committee; the appointment was announced on May 30, 2012, effective July 1, 2012.  Before appointment, Lewis was a key planner of the new college's curriculum, and supervised the hiring of core faculty. The College's first students matriculated on July 2, 2013 and graduated on May 29, 2017.
As President, Lewis advocated the concept of residential liberal arts education as "building a community of learning."

Publications

Books
The Cambridge Companion to European Modernism. Cambridge: Cambridge University Press, 2011. 
Religious Experience and the Modernist Novel. New York : Cambridge University Press, 2010. ISBN
The Cambridge Introduction to Modernism. Cambridge: Cambridge University Press, 2007. .
Modernism, Nationalism, and the Novel. Cambridge, U.K.: Cambridge University Press, 2000. 
Review by Alan Munton;  The Modern Language Review, Apr., 2003, vol. 98, no. 2, p. 443-444

Articles
“Proust, Woolf, and modern fiction.” Romanic Review 99 (2008): 77–86.
“The Reality of the unseen: Shared fictions and religious experience in the ghost stories of Henry James.” Arizona Quarterly 61.2 (Summer 2005): 33–66.
“Christopher Newman’s haircloth shirt: worldly asceticism, conversion, and auto-machia in The American.” Studies in the Novel 37 (2005): 308–28.
“Churchgoing in the Modern Novel.” Modernism/Modernity 11 (2004): 667–94.
 “James’s Sick Souls.” Henry James Review 22 (2001): 248–58.
“‘His Sympathies were in the Right Place’: Heart of Darkness and the discourse of national character.” Nineteenth-Century Literature 53 (1998): 211-44. (Reprinted in Joseph Conrad’s Heart of Darkness: Modern Critical Interpretations,  2008).
“The ‘True’ Homer: myth and enlightenment in Vico, Horkheimer, and Adorno." New Vico Studies 10 (1992): 24–35.

Books edited
Norton Anthology of World Literature New York: Norton, 2012.  Ed. Martin Puchner et al.

References

External links
Lewis's Webspace at Yale

Living people
1968 births
Yale University faculty
McGill University alumni